Maersk Convincer is a jackup rig built in Singapore and owned by Danish Maersk Drilling.

Construction and career 
Maersk Convincer was built in the mid 2000s and was originally named PetroJack III by Jurong Shipyard, Jurong, Singapore and commissioned in 2008.

Convincer’s first service took place in Brunei for the first time and worked for Brunei Shell Petroleum for workover and development.

In 2010, she went to Vietnam for exploration under Haong Long and later Phy Quy Petroleum.

Her next contract was in Malaysia under Petronas for exploration, development and workover in 2012.

Maersk Convincer arrived in Brunei in September 2017 for the second time and work for Brunei Shell Petroleum by taking over Maersk Completer. In November 2018, she got a 2.5 contra year extension in Brunei. Convincer won the Jack-up rig of the year in 2019 outstanding contributions. Convincer’s contract in Brunei is expected to end in 2Q 2021.

Gallery

References 

Maersk Oil
2008 ships 
Jack-up rigs 
Oil platforms
Buildings and structures in Brunei
Ships built in Singapore